Maria Kollia Tsaroucha is a Greek politician from Serres, the Deputy Minister of the Interior for Macedonia and Thrace until August 2018 in the Cabinet of Alexis Tsipras and a former member of parliament with Independent Greeks until 7 July 2019. She was also Deputy Speaker of the Hellenic Parliament.

Early life and education 
Mrs. Kollia-Tsaroucha was born in Serres on 21 February 1958. She is a graduate of the law school of Aristotelian University of Thessaloniki.

Political career
From 1983 to 2012, Kollia-Tsaroucha was a member of the Women's section of New Democracy. She ended up as member of the Central Committee of New Democracy and the party's section responsible for Education and Religion.

In 2000, she was elected to the Hellenic Parliament for the Serres prefecture. In  2004, 2007, and 2009, she was reelected. During this time, she was President of the Special Standing Committee on Equality, Youth and Human Rights and of the Standing Committee on Educational Affairs. She was a member of the Standing Committees of Foreign Affairs and Defence, and also of Public Administration and Justice.

In February 2012, after a vote against the second memorandum, she was expelled from her party's parliamentary caucus. The following month she joined the new party Independent Greeks and took up the function of Parliamentary Representative of Parliamentary Group of the party along with Christos Zois.

In the May 2012 elections, she was reelected on the ballot of Independent Greeks in the Serres constituency. On 18 May 2012, she was elected sixth deputy speaker of the parliament, with 185 votes in favour and 96 abstaining.

In the June 2012 elections, the Independent Greeks placed her first on the list of their candidates (in accordance with the preferences expressed in the May election). The party preserved her seat in Serres RO, renewing only her place in rank. She was elected sixth deputy speaker with 225 votes in favour.

In the election of 25 January 2015, she was re-elected parliamentarian from Serres for the Independent Greeks. With the formation of the government of Alexis Tsipras, she was appointed Deputy Minister for Macedonia and Thrace. She has been consistently opposed to the use of Macedonia in the name of the Former Yugoslav Republic of Macedonia.

Kollia-Tsaroucha is a member of the Interparliamentary Assembly on Orthodoxy's International Secretariat, holding the position of treasurer.

Personal life
She is married to Christos Tsarouchas (an architectural engineer). She has one son, Konstantinos (a political scientist) and a daughter Katerina  (a sociologist and journalist).

Electoral results

References

1958 births
New Democracy (Greece) politicians
Independent Greeks politicians
People from Serres
Living people
Aristotle University of Thessaloniki alumni
Greek MPs 2015–2019